Death Came Softly is a 1943 detective story by E.C.R. Lorac, the pen name of the British writer Edith Caroline Rivett. It was the twenty third entry in her long-running series featuring Chief Inspector MacDonald of Scotland Yard.

Synopsis
An anthropology professor living in the Hermit's cave at Valehead House, his daughter's Devon estate, is founded gassed to death by carbon monoxide one morning. Chief Inspector MacDonald is called in to solve the baffling crime.

References

Bibliography
 Hubin, Allen J. Crime Fiction, 1749-1980: A Comprehensive Bibliography. Garland Publishing, 1984.
 Nichols, Victoria & Thompson, Susan. Silk Stalkings: More Women Write of Murder. Scarecrow Press, 1998.
 Reilly, John M. Twentieth Century Crime & Mystery Writers. Springer, 2015.

1943 British novels
British mystery novels
Novels by E.C.R. Lorac
Novels set in Devon
British detective novels
Collins Crime Club books